The Biola Eagles are the athletic teams that represent Biola University, located in La Mirada, California, in intercollegiate sports as a member of the Division II level of the National Collegiate Athletic Association (NCAA), primarily competing in the Pacific West Conference (PacWest) since the 2017–18 academic year; while its men's and women's swimming & diving teams compete in the Pacific Collegiate Swim and Dive Conference (PCSC). They were also a member of the National Christian College Athletic Association (NCCAA), primarily competing as an independent in the West Region of the Division I level. The Eagles previously competed in the Golden State Athletic Conference (GSAC) of the National Association of Intercollegiate Athletics (NAIA) from 1994–95 to 2016–17.

History
Biola University Athletics was an active member of the NAIA from 1964–2017. The Eagles were accepted for provisional NCAA membership on July 20, 2016 and played their initial PacWest Conference season in 2017–18. BU was accepted for full NCAA Division II membership on July 12, 2019. Biola University was established as the Bible Institute of Los Angeles in 1908.

Varsity teams
Biola competes in 18 intercollegiate varsity sports: Men's sports include baseball, basketball, cross country, soccer, swimming, tennis, track & field and water polo; while women's sports include basketball, cross country, golf, soccer, softball, swimming, tennis, track & field, volleyball and water polo. Former sports included men's golf.

Men's basketball
Dave Holmquist is the school’s men’s basketball coach. He coached for 40 seasons in the National Association of Intercollegiate Athletics and is the winningest active coach in the NAIA Division I rankings (947–364).

Athletic director
Dr. Bethany Miller currently serves as the Athletic Director overseeing all 18 varsity programs.

References

External links